Brisas is a district of the Zarcero canton, in the Alajuela province of Costa Rica.

History 
Brisas was created on 24 April 1998 by Decreto Ejecutivo 26942-G.

Geography 
Brisas has an area of  km² and an elevation of  metres.

Locations
 Poblados (villages): Ángeles, Brisa, Legua

Demographics 

For the 2011 census, Brisas had a population of  inhabitants.

Transportation

Road transportation 
The district is covered by the following road routes:
 National Route 141

References 

Districts of Alajuela Province
Populated places in Alajuela Province